Aoranthe penduliflora is a species of flowering plant in the family Rubiaceae. It is endemic to Tanzania where it is found in the Usambara Mountains.  It is threatened by habitat loss caused by logging, mining, and agriculture.  It grows as a tree with simple, opposite leaves.  The flowers are cream and red, and the fruit ripens orange.

References

External links
 

Endemic flora of Tanzania
Gardenieae
Vulnerable plants
Taxonomy articles created by Polbot